David John Honey (born 18 April 1958) is an Australian politician who has been the Liberal Party member for the electoral district of Cottesloe in the Western Australian Legislative Assembly since 2018. He was leader of the WA Liberal Party between March 2021 and January 2023, and was previously the Shadow Minister for Industrial Development, Water and Lands, and the Liberal Party's Legislative Assembly Policy Co-ordinator.

Education and early career
Honey completed a Bachelor of Science with first-class Honours and a PhD in Chemistry at the University of Western Australia, as well as being the UWA Science Union President. He has held technical roles including as a Forensic Scientist and Environmental Scientist with the State Government, and also formed the Hydrometallurgy Research Group for Western Australian Mining Corporation.

Honey was formerly the Global Residue Manager for Alcoa's Refining operations, having overall accountability for the refining residue operations in the United States, Spain, Brazil and Australia. Prior to that role, Honey held senior management and technical roles in Alcoa. He joined Alcoa as a Senior Principal Research Scientist in the Global Refining Centre of Excellence before moving on to the positions of Clarification Manager, Pinjarra Refinery, Digestion manager, Kwinana Refinery, Production Manager, Kwinana Refinery, and Western Australian Operations Residue Manager.

From 2012 to 2018, he was the President of the Kwinana Industries Council, a lobby group representing chemical, petroleum, cement and other firms in Kwinana.

Political career
From 1994 to 1997, Honey was president of WA Liberal Party. During that time, he was aligned with controversial Liberal Party power broker Noel Crichton-Browne, but when Crichton-Browne made inappropriate sexual comments to journalist Colleen Egan at a Liberal Party conference in July 1995, Honey initiated the successful motion to expel Crichton-Browne from the party. Honey later explained in March 2021, that as the party president, he had to deal with the issue of Crichton-Browne being a power broker and his "undue influence" over the party and preselections.

Honey was elected to the Western Australian Legislative Assembly in the Cottesloe by-election on 17 March 2018, following the resignation of former Premier Colin Barnett. At the 2021 state election, Honey was one of only two Liberals to hold their seats in the massive landslide victory by the Labor Party, and the only non-Labor MP from Perth. The other Liberal member, Libby Mettam, declined to contest the party leadership, leaving the position open for Honey when the party's parliamentary wing met to elect a leader on 23 March 2021. Upon his election as leader, Honey brought up his role in the expulsion of Crichton-Browne in 1995 as a reason why he should be leader of what remained of the WA Liberals, and vowed to oversee a "root and branch" analysis and restructuring of the party.

In January 2023, Honey was challenged for the leadership by Mettam. Honey pulled out of the leadership contest on 30 January and Mettam replaced him as party leader unopposed.

References

External links

1958 births
Living people
Members of the Western Australian Legislative Assembly
Liberal Party of Australia members of the Parliament of Western Australia
University of Western Australia alumni
21st-century Australian politicians
Alcoa people